China participated at the 2015 Summer Universiade, in Gwangju, South Korea.

Medals by sport

Medalists

Diving 

Men

References

External links
 Country Overview:China Gwangju 2015

Nations at the 2015 Summer Universiade
China at the Summer Universiade
2015 in Chinese sport